Ronivaldo "Rony" Delgado Cruz (born 1 January 1995) is a Cape Verdean professional footballer who last played for Spanish club Arandina CF as a defender.

Football career
On 12 September 2015, Cruz made his professional debut with Farense in a 2015–16 LigaPro match against Sporting Covilhã.

References

External links

Stats and profile at LPFP 

1995 births
Living people
Cape Verdean footballers
Association football defenders
Liga Portugal 2 players
S.C. Farense players
Arandina CF players